John Wood Oman, FBA (1860–1939) was a Scottish theologian and Presbyterian minister.

The son of farmer, Oman was born on 23 July 1860 and grew up on Orkney. He studied philosophy at the University of Edinburgh (1877–82), and then studied at the United Presbyterian Church's theological college in Edinburgh. In 1904 Oman gained a PhD from the University of Edinburgh. He was minister of Clayport Street Church in Alnwick (1889–1907). From 1907 to 1922, he was Professor of Systematic Theology and Apologetics at Westminster College, Cambridge. He then served as the college's principal from 1922 until his retirement in 1935. In the meantime, he was Kerr Lecturer at the University of Glasgow (1906), Stanton Lecturer at the University of Cambridge (1913–16, 1919–22 and 1929–31) and Moderator of the General Assembly of the Presbyterian Church in 1931–32. He taught and published several books on theology. He received honorary Doctor of Divinity (DD) degrees from the universities of Oxford and Edinburgh, and in 1938 he was elected a fellow of the British Academy. He died on 7 May 1939; his wife, Mary Hannah (née Blair), with whom he had four children, had died in 1936.

Selected works
 Grace and Personality (London: Collins, 1917).
 The Natural and the Supernatural (Cambridge: Cambridge University Press, 1931).
 Honest Religion (Cambridge: Cambridge University Press, 1941).

References

Further reading
 George Alexander and H. H. Farmer, "Memoir", in J. W. Oman, Honest Religion (Cambridge: Cambridge University Press, 1941), pp. xv–xxxii.
 Stephen Bevans, John Oman and His Doctrine of God (Cambridge: Cambridge University Press, 1992).
 Joan Crewsden, Christian Doctrine in the Light of Michael Polanyi's Theory of Personal Knowledge: A Personality Theology (Lampeter; Edwin Mellen Press, 1994).
 George Grant, "The Concept of Nature and Supernature in the Theology of John Oman" (DPhil thesis, University of Oxford, 1950). Published in George Grant, Collected Works of George Grant, vol. 1: 1933–1950, ed. Arthur Davis and Peter C. Emberley (Toronto: University of Toronto Press, 2000), pp. 157–401.
 Francis George Healey, Religion and Reality: The Theology of John Oman (Edinburgh and London: Oliver and Boyd, 1965).
 John Hick, "Oman, John Wood", in Paul Edwards (ed.), The Encyclopedia of Philosophy (New York: Macmillan, 1967), p. 537.
 Adam Hood, Baillie, Oman and Macmurray: Experience and Religious Belief (Ashgate: Ashgate, 2003).
 Eric George McKimmon, "John Oman: Orkney's Theologian: A Contextual Study of John Oman's Theology with Reference to Personal Freedom as the Unifying Principle" (PhD thesis, University of Edinburgh, 2012).
 F. R. Tennant, "John Wood Oman, 1860–1939", Proceedings of the British Academy, vol. 25 (1939), pp. 333–338.
 Yandall Clark Woodfin, "John Wood Oman (1860–1939): A Critical Study of His Contribution to Theology" (PhD dissertation, New College, Edinburgh, 1962).

External links
 

1860 births
1939 deaths
Scottish theologians
Fellows of the British Academy